The 2015 J&T Banka Prague Open was a professional women's tennis tournaments played on outdoor clay courts. It was the 6th edition of the tournament which was an International tournament on the 2015 WTA Tour. It took place at the Sparta Prague Tennis Club in Prague, Czech Republic, from 27 April to 2 May 2015. This was the event's first edition as a WTA International tournament.

Points and prize money distribution

Points distribution

Prize money

Singles main draw entrants

Seeds 

 1 Rankings as of 20 April 2015.

Other entrants 
The following players received wildcards into the singles main draw:
  Denisa Allertová
  Klára Koukalová
  Kristína Schmiedlová

The following players received entry from the qualifying draw:
  Olga Govortsova
  Lucie Hradecká
  Ana Konjuh
  Danka Kovinić

Withdrawals 
Before the tournament
  Magdaléna Rybáriková → replaced by Kateřina Siniaková
  Carla Suárez Navarro → replaced by Yanina Wickmayer

Doubles main draw entrants

Seeds 

 1 Rankings as of 20 April 2015.

Other entrants 
The following pair received wildcard into the main draw:
  Kateřina Vaňková /  Markéta Vondroušová

Withdrawals 
Before the tournament
  Mirjana Lučić-Baroni (gastrointestinal illness)

Finals

Singles 

  Karolína Plíšková defeated  Lucie Hradecká, 4–6, 7–5, 6–3

Doubles 

  Belinda Bencic /  Kateřina Siniaková defeated  Kateryna Bondarenko /  Eva Hrdinová, 6–2, 6–2

External links 
 Official website

2015 WTA Tour
2015
2015 in Czech tennis